Genezi Alves de Andrade (born 31 August 1972) is a retired Brazilian Paralympic swimmer who competed at international elite competitions. He is a five-time Paralympic medalist, eight-time World medalist and double Parapan American Games champion.

References

1972 births
Living people
People from Natal, Rio Grande do Norte
Paralympic swimmers of Brazil
Swimmers at the 1992 Summer Paralympics
Swimmers at the 1996 Summer Paralympics
Swimmers at the 2000 Summer Paralympics
Swimmers at the 2004 Summer Paralympics
Swimmers at the 2008 Summer Paralympics
Medalists at the 1992 Summer Paralympics
Medalists at the 1996 Summer Paralympics
Medalists at the 2000 Summer Paralympics
Medalists at the World Para Swimming Championships
Medalists at the 2003 Parapan American Games
Medalists at the 2011 Parapan American Games
Brazilian male freestyle swimmers
Brazilian male backstroke swimmers
Brazilian male breaststroke swimmers
Brazilian male medley swimmers
S3-classified Paralympic swimmers
Sportspeople from Rio Grande do Norte
20th-century Brazilian people
21st-century Brazilian people